Falco 3 is the third studio album by Austrian singer and rapper Falco, released on 15 October 1985 by GiG Records in Austria, by Teldec in Germany and by A&M Records elsewhere. In the United States, it peaked at number three on the Billboard 200 and at number 18 on the Top R&B/Hip-Hop Albums chart. Following two albums produced and co-written by Robert Ponger, this is Falco's first album to be produced by Bolland & Bolland.

Background
Following an Academy Award-winning film about Mozart, the Americanised mix of "Rock Me Amadeus" capitalised on and continued a resurgence of interest in the Viennese composer, and was an instant success in the US, spending three weeks at number one on the Billboard Hot 100 and peaking at number four on the dance chart and number six on the R&B singles chart. The album was released in the US, the UK and Japan (and a few other countries) with a different track listing: the singles "Rock Me Amadeus" and "Vienna Calling" are presented in extended mixes, the 'Salieri Version' (8:20) and the 'Metternich Arrival Mix' (7:38), whereas in the rest of the world, the album uses the normal European singles mixes.

Other songs
"Vienna Calling" continued the geographic and stylistic theme, and followed its predecessor as far as the US top 20. A third single, a power ballad called "Jeanny" sung from the point of view of a rapist and possible murderer, proved a controversial hit in Europe; banned by some radio programmers there, it nevertheless improved on the chart peak of its predecessor, though it was virtually ignored in the U.S.  The album also included a reworked German-language version of the Cars' song "Looking for Love", titled "Munich Girls", as well as a lounge lizard cover of Bob Dylan's "It's All Over Now, Baby Blue".

Track listing
 "Rock Me Amadeus" (The Gold Mix) (U.S., U.K. and Japan version substitutes "The Salieri Version", spelled wrongly as "Solieri Version") (3:22/8:20)
 "America" (The City of Grinzing Version) (3:56)
 "Tango the Night" (The Heart Mix) (2:28)
 "Munich Girls" (Lookin' for Love) (Just Another Paid One) (4:17)
 "Jeanny" (Sus-Mix-Spect Crime Version) (5:50)
 "Vienna Calling" (Waiting For the Extended Mix) (U.S.,U.K. and Japan version substitutes "The Metternich Arrival Mix") (4:02/7:38)
 "Männer des Westens – Any Kind of Land" (Wilde Bube Version) (4:00)
 "Nothing Sweeter Than Arabia" (The Relevant Madhouse Danceteria Jour-Fix-Mix) (4:46)
 "Macho Macho" (Sensible Boy's Song) (4:56)
 "It's All Over Now, Baby Blue" (No Mix) (4:41)

Despite all the songs boasting special mixes on the cover (e.g. "The Heart Mix"), these are all the normal album versions. The only re-mixes are to be found on the U.S., U.K. and Japanese version of this album, which contain the "Salieri Version" of "Rock Me Amadeus" and the "Metternich Arrival Mix" of "Vienna Calling" instead of the normal European versions. The European CD versions of this album have a wrongly mastered version of "It's All Over Now, Baby Blue", which contains a repeated loop and therefore runs short over 5 minutes - the Anniversary Edition of this album finally corrected this mistake.

Originally Falco wanted to include an 11th song (the self-written "Without You") on the album but due to contract reasons and the fact that the melody-based song didn't fit in with the other, Bolland & Bolland written songs, the song was omitted.

The 25th Anniversary Edition, released on 22 October 2010, adds the following bonus tracks to the original (and remastered) album tracks:

 "Jeanny" (cover/remix version by the British band Hurts) (3:38)
 "Without You" (demo version, unreleased song from the "Falco 3" sessions 1985) (5:45)
 "Rock Me Amadeus" (Extended Version) (7:07)  [first time on CD]
 "Vienna Calling" (Tourist Version) (7:07) [first time on CD]
 "Männer des Westens – Any Kind of Land" (Extended Version) (5:23) (b-side of "Jeanny" 12-inch version) [first time on cd]
 "Urban Tropical" (Extended Version) (7:26) (b-side of "Rock me Amadeus 12-inch version) [first time on CD]

The two-CD Deluxe Version has additional video material:

 "The Making Of The Legendary "Falco 3" (documentary by DoRo) which also includes the famous Salieri Version of "Rock Me Amadeus" in an edited form, running short over 7 minutes.

Charts

Weekly charts

Year-end charts

Certifications

Notes

References

1985 albums
A&M Records albums
Falco (musician) albums
German-language albums